A rake is an angle of slope measured from horizontal, or in some contexts from a vertical line 90° perpendicular to horizontal.

A 60° rake would mean that the line is pointing 60° up from horizontal, either forwards or backwards relative to the object.

Usage
Though the term may be used in a general manner, it is commonly applied in several specific contexts.

The rake of a ship's prow is the angle at which the prow rises from the water (the rake below water being called the bow rake). A motorcycle or bicycle fork rake is the angle at which the forks are angled down towards the ground. See also caster angle, which is the angular displacement of the steering axis from the vertical axis of a steered wheel.

In machining and sawing the rake angle is the angle from the cutting head to the object being worked on (with a perpendicular angle conventionally being a 0° rake). In geology the rake is the angle at which one rock moves against another in a geological fault.

In a theatre or opera house the stage can be raked to slope up towards the back of the stage to allow better viewing for the audience.

See also 
 Pitch angle, one of the angular degrees of freedom of any stiff body (for example a vehicle), describing rotation about the side-to-side axis

References

Shipbuilding
Machining
Tectonics
Units of angle